The 2015 PSA Men's World Squash Championship is the men's edition of the 2015 World Championship, which serves as the individual world championship for squash players. The event took place in Bellevue, Washington in the United States from 15 to 22 November 2015. Grégory Gaultier won his first World Championship title, defeating Omar Mosaad in the final.

Prize money and ranking points
For 2015, the prize purse was $325,000. The prize money and points breakdown is as follows:

Seeds

Draw and results

Finals

Top half

Section 1

Section 2

Bottom half

Section 1

Section 2

See also
World Championship
2015 Women's World Open Squash Championship
2015 Men's World Team Squash Championships

References

External links
PSA World Championship official website
PSA World Championship page

World Squash Championships
Men's World Open Squash Championship
Squash tournaments in the United States
International sports competitions hosted by the United States
2015 in American sports
2015 in sports in Washington (state)
Bellevue, Washington
Sports competitions in Washington (state)
Squash in Washington (state)